International Journal of Hematology is the official journal of the Japanese Society of Hematology. Since 2008, it has been published by Springer Japan, but used to be published by Carden Jennings.

Indexing
International Journal of Hematology is indexed in the following databases:

References

English-language journals
Hematology journals